Everybody Likes Hampton Hawes (subtitled Vol. 3: The Trio) is the third album by pianist Hampton Hawes recorded in 1956 and released on the Contemporary label.

Reception

The Allmusic review by Scott Yanow states that Hawes "comes up with consistently creative ideas throughout this swinging bop date".

Track listing
All compositions by Hampton Hawes except as indicated
 "Somebody Loves Me" (George Gershwin, Buddy DeSylva, Ballard MacDonald) - 5:32
 "The Sermon" - 3:42
 "Embraceable You" (George Gershwin, Ira Gershwin) - 4:58
 "I Remember You" (Victor Schertzinger, Johnny Mercer) - 4:28 		
 "A Night in Tunisia" (Dizzy Gillespie) - 3:54
 "Lover, Come Back to Me/Bean and the Boys" (Sigmund Romberg, Oscar Hammerstein II; Coleman Hawkins) - 5:13 		
 "Polka Dots and Moonbeams" (Jimmy Van Heusen, Johnny Burke) - 4:42
 "Billy Boy" (Traditional) - 3:01
 "Body and Soul" (Johnny Green, Frank Eyton, Edward Heyman, Robert Sour) - 4:17
 "Coolin' the Blues" - 4:18

Personnel
Hampton Hawes - piano
Red Mitchell - bass 
Chuck Thompson - drums

References

Contemporary Records albums
Hampton Hawes albums
1956 albums